Nubuke Foundation is an art foundation in East Legon in the Greater Accra Region of Ghana. It was established in April 2006.

Exhibitions

Time, Trade & Travel 
The Time, Trade & Travel took place at Stedelijk Museum Bureau Amsterdam from 25 August to 21 October 2012 in Amsterdam, Netherlands, in the context of Project 1975 and was organised in collaboration with the Nubuke Foundation, Accra, Ghana. Under the broad umbrella of a title-Time, Trade & Travel, the history of Ghana's encounter with the Netherlands was being examined by 4 Ghanaian and 5 Dutch artists (Bernard Akoi-Jackson, Dorothy Akpene Amenuke, Serge Attukwei Clottey, Zachary Formwalt, Iris Kensmil, Aukje Koks, Navid Nuur, Jeremiah Quarshie, kari-kacha seid’ou and Katarina Zdjelar).

Du Bois in Our Time 
An exhibition on the legacy of W.E.B. Du Bois organised by University Museum of Contemporary Art, University of Massachusetts Amherst, Massachusetts in 2012 n collaboration with Nubuke Foundation

References

External links 
 Nubuke Foundation Website
 Arts Collaboratory

Cultural organisations based in Ghana
Arts organizations based in Africa